Quincy College (QC) is a public community college in Quincy, Massachusetts. It is an open admission commuter school that offers associate degrees, bachelor degrees, and certificate programs. It was founded in 1958 and enrolls approximately 4,500 students at campuses in Quincy and Plymouth, Massachusetts.

History

During the mid-1950s, demand for higher education on the South Shore, and Quincy in particular, led to the creation of the Citizen's Committee appointed to study the feasibility of establishing a community college. This committee recommended that a community college should exist and as early as 1956, the first college-level courses were offered.

The school's first classes were offered at the Coddington Elementary School in 1956 as College Courses, Inc., after a committee was created to establish a new community college and Timothy L. Smith, historian and professor at the Eastern Nazarene College (ENC), was named its first director. It was sponsored by the Quincy School Department and used faculty from Eastern Nazarene. Another ENC history professor, Charles W. Akers, became its first full-time director and transformed it into a junior college in 1958, naming it Quincy Junior College (QJC) when it was first given power to grant associate's degrees in the Commonwealth of Massachusetts.

In May 1957, College Courses, Inc., a non-profit charitable organization, was formed to help further higher education on the South Shore. In the fall of that same year, the first freshman class began at what would later be known as Quincy College.

Less than five years later, Quincy College was empowered to award the Associate in Arts and the Associate in Science degrees. Quincy College is accredited by the New England Commission of Higher Education.

Quincy College is one of the last municipally owned colleges in the USA. In 1991, the school founded the Plymouth campus located thirty minutes south of Quincy in downtown Plymouth, Massachusetts.

In January 2022, the college began offering a bachelors degree in Business Management.

Nursing program shut down and resignation of President Peter Tsaffaras
On May 9, 2018, the Massachusetts Board of Registration in Nursing withdrew its approval of the college's nursing program. The percentage of Quincy college graduates who passed licensure exams on their first try in 2017 was just 54%; this was down from 59% in 2016 and 72% in 2015. Shortly afterward, Quincy College President Peter Tsaffaras offered his resignation and said he had lost the confidence of the college's board of governors.

Less than one year after withdrawing its approval, the Board of Registration in Nursing voted to allow reopening of a refreshed and updated nursing program on the Quincy and Plymouth Campuses.

Presidents

Campus
The main campus is in Quincy Center located at 1250 Hancock St, President's Place. Saville Hall which is also part of Quincy College is located 24 Saville Ave. There is also another satellite campus in Plymouth, MA. The school does not have residential facilities, as it is a commuter school.

Organization
Quincy College operates under the auspices of the City of Quincy. The college is unusual in this respect, as it is the only one of Massachusetts' 16 community colleges to be run by a city, rather than the Commonwealth of Massachusetts. It is one of only two colleges in the United States organized this way. Until the 1990s, it was run by the Quincy School Committee, but now has its own governing board.

Academics
The college confers 37 Associate degrees and 25 certificates of completion in a wide variety of studies. Quincy College operates an articulation agreement with Cambridge College for four-year baccalaureate degrees and with Excelsior College for online learning. It is accredited by the New England Association of Schools and Colleges (NEASC). The school is an open enrollment institution, meaning that it accepts all students with a high school diploma or equivalent to matriculate, regardless of academic abilities, without selectivity. As of 2010, there were 4,505 students enrolled.

Notable alumni
 Bruce Ayers, member of the Massachusetts House of Representatives since 1998.
 William G. Gross, Boston Police Commissioner.

References

External links
 Official website

 
1958 establishments in Massachusetts
Community colleges in Massachusetts
Educational institutions established in 1958
Plymouth, Massachusetts
Universities and colleges in Quincy, Massachusetts